Dmytro Yehorovych Chernysh (born 10 August 2004) is a Ukrainian professional footballer who plays as a central midfielder for Vorskla Poltava in the Ukrainian Premier League.

Career

Early years
Chernysh is a product of DVUFK Dnipro and Metalurh Zaporizhzhia academies.

Vorskla Poltava
In July 2021 he was signed by Vorskla Poltava. He made his debut as a second half-taim substituted player for Vorskla Poltava in the Ukrainian Premier League in an away drowing match against Veres Rivne on 12 March 2023.

International career
In March 2023, Chernysh was called up to the final squad of the Ukraine national under-19 football team to play in the 2023 UEFA European Under-19 Championship elit round qualification matches.

References

External links
 
 

2004 births
Living people
Place of birth missing (living people)
Ukrainian footballers
Association football midfielders
FC Vorskla Poltava players
Ukrainian Premier League players